The Brazilian Advisory Rating (abbreviated ClassInd) is a content rating system for the classification of movies, games and television programs. The ClassInd rating system is controlled by the Advisory Rating Coordination (Coordenação de Classificação Indicativa) of the Department of Justice Policies (Departamento de Políticas de Justiça). It is established on the National Secretariat of Justice (Secretaria Nacional de Justiça) of the Ministry of Justice.

Staff
The staff consists of about 30 people, including raters and the administrative staff, having passed public service exams, with various academic backgrounds. These content rating analysts undergo continuous training, and never affix a rating individually. All works are watched by at least two analysts separately and if there is no consensus, the analysis group is broadened.

Analyses and criteria
The criteria that guide the public policy of the content rating are supported under 3 broad themes—sex, drugs, and violence—content considered inappropriate to the upbringing of children and adolescents. The analysis is made counterbalancing the frequency, relevance, context, intensity and importance to the plot of scenes, dialogues and images containing violence, drug use and sex/nudity. This margin of subjectivity ensures flexibilities that are critical to the process and the rating result. The analyses consist of three steps: factual description, thematic description and age grading. When the process is finished, it is subjected to the coordination, and finally to the director of the department, who makes the order for publication on the Brazilian Official Journal, along with small content descriptors. The criteria for rating the works were developed taking into account national and international studies and public hearings in all regions across Brazil, including public debates, both face-to-face and online.

Aiming to provide an instrument for the choice of the family, the Practical Guide was created, which claims to bring transparency and objectivity to the public policy of the content rating, showing detailed analysis criteria, subdivided by age groups. They can serve broadcasters, producers and distributors of movies and games and also families and society in general.

The objectivity of the analysis departs from moral considerations and moralistic views. The Ministry of Justice specifically cited that sexual orientation does not aggravate the rating and that, in fact, showing material of respect and encouragement to diversity can attenuate the rating. They also specified that their job is to give an advisory rating for parents, therefore, they do not have any legal right to ban, demand cuts or refuse to rate any work.

Works

Films and television programs
People under the minimum age indicated by the rating can watch the movie if accompanied by an adult guardian or if they are carrying a consent form, except for 18-rated movies on the cinemas. Movies rated 18 are restricted to persons aged 16 and over, and those aged 16 and 17 should be accompanied by an adult guardian.  Films for cinema and DVD/Blu-ray releases are previously rated by the ClassInd. TV programs are rated by their own broadcasters and therefore the rating can be accepted or denied if considered inappropriate.

Video games
The Entertainment Software Rating Board (ESRB) system was de facto adopted by some Brazilian distributors, consequence of working with North American publishers, and was not translated from English or adapted to the Brazilian culture, being inappropriate for the Brazilian market and leaving most consumers uninformed. It was introduced by Senator José Gregori, that the growing game market in Brazil needed bigger control over the countless games sold in the country every day.

Since 2001, games are rated in Brazil by the Department of Justice, Rating, Titles and Qualification, part of the Ministry of Justice.

The ClassInd rating system is the same for games, films and television programs. Rating is mandatory for all games released in Brazil. However, after becoming a member of the International Age Rating Coalition in 2013, it became easier for digitally distributed games to receive a ClassInd rating.

Rating ranges
NOTE: There are also operational descriptions of attenuating and aggravating elements, such as scene composition, relevance, frequency, motivation, among others, that can interfere on the final rating.

Former ratings

Content descriptors
Information on the rating system includes content descriptors which are a summary of the main rating indicators inserted in the work rated. The list of descriptors explains the rating system and also informs parents and guardians about the type of content that the work contains. 
For instance, a work rated as "10 years old" and with the descriptor "Violence" will contain light violent scenes, while a work rated as "16 years old" and the same descriptor will show stronger violent scenes. 
Below is a list of the fifteen terms used in the rating system:

 Violência (Violence);     
 Violência Extrema (Extreme Violence);  
 Conteúdo Sexual (Sexual Content);   
 Nudez (Nudity);   
 Sexo (Sex);      
 Sexo Explícito (Explicit Sex);    
 Drogas (Drugs); 
 Drogas Lícitas (Legal Drugs); 
 Drogas Ilícitas (Illegal Drugs); 
 Linguagem Imprópria (Inappropriate Language); 
 Atos Criminosos (Criminal Acts); 
 Conteúdo Impactante (Shocking Content);
Temas Sensíveis (Sensitive Themes); 
Procedimentos Médicos (Medical Procedures); 
Medo (Fear).

Requesting a rating 
In order to request a Qualification Rating, one will have to provide a documentation (in a Portuguese-language form) which explains why a media (game/TV show, etc.) is recommended or not to a certain rating. A preview of that media is also compulsory to avoid mistakes during media verification.

The document will have to be sent to the Department of Justice, Rating, Titles and Qualification. There's no fee to get the rating and the process from the documents reception to the official rating can take about 20 days.

References

External links
Department of Justice, Rating, Titles and Qualification page (in Portuguese)
Rated movies and games database (in Portuguese)
Links to the needed forms (in Portuguese)

Mass media in Brazil
Media content ratings systems
Entertainment rating organizations
Video game content ratings systems
Motion picture rating systems
Government agencies of Brazil
Organisations based in Brasília